The Idaho State Arboretum is an arboretum located across the campus of the Idaho State University, Pocatello, Idaho, United States. It is open to the public daily without charge and includes an organized tree walk.

Exhibits
Trees and shrubs in the arboretum include: 

  Acer glabrum
  Acer negundo
  Aesculus hippocastanum
  Berberis thunbergii
  Betula pendula var. dalecarlica
  Buddleja davidii
  Celtis occidentalis
  Cercis canadensis
  Cercocarpus ledifolius
  Crataegus oxyacantha
  Forsythia intermedia
  Fraxinus pennsylvanica
  Juglans nigra
  Kolkwitzia amabilis
  Lonicera tatarica
  Magnolia stellata
  Mahonia aquifolium
  Malus spectablis
  Philadelphus lewisii
  Picea abies
  Pinus edulis
  Picea pungens
  Pinus mugo
  Pinus nigra
  Pinus sylvestri
  Populus tremuloides
  Potentilla fruticosa
  Prunus cerasifera
  Prunus virginiana
  Pyrus calleryana var. Bradford
  Quercus robur var. fastigiata
  Salix blanda
  Syringa
  Taxus x media
  Thuja orientalis
  Ulmus americana
  Ulmus glabra var. camperdownii
  Ulmus pumila
  Viburnum opulus

See also 
 List of botanical gardens in the United States

External links
Guide to the Plants of The Idaho State Arboretum

Arboreta in Idaho
Botanical gardens in Idaho
Protected areas of Bannock County, Idaho
Pocatello, Idaho
Arboretum